NBGI Private Equity was the National Bank of Greece's European private equity and venture capital investment firm, founded in 2000. The firm typically invests in a deal size between £5 million ($9.40 million) and £50 million ($94.09 million) with an equity investment between £2 million ($3.2 million) and £15 million ($24.05 million). As of 2016, it funds were sold in a secondary transaction to an independent investment manager Stage Capital with funding from limited partners including Deutsche Bank Private Equity and Goldman Sachs Asset Management.

NBGI Private Equity's funds invest in a range of different private equity sectors including lower mid-market buy-outs, growth capital for small and medium-sized companies, venture capital for technology businesses and real estate. It has offices in London, Paris, Athens, Istanbul, Sofia and Bucharest.

The Management Board of NBGI Private Equity were: Pavlos Stellakis (Chairman and CEO);
Mark Owen (Director);Stratos Chatzigiannis (Director); Omiros Millas (Investment Director in the SEE Fund); Orestis Millas (Investment Director);  Yannis Voyatzis.

NBGI Private Equity managed funds focusing on private equity, real estate and venture capital across a number of different geographies across Europe.

In 2015 National Bank of Greece announced it would sell NBGI. In September 2016, the transaction of selling it funds to Stage Capital was completed.

References

2000 establishments in England
Banks established in 2000
Defunct companies based in London
Banks of the United Kingdom